Tor Castle is a ruined castle, about  north east of Fort William, Highland, Scotland, west of the River Lochy and east of the Caledonian Canal, near Torlundy.

History
An Iron Age fort previously occupied the site. According to tradition, the fort once belonged to Banquo who features in Macbeth. There has been a castle at the site since at least the eleventh century. In 1291 a splendid match was arranged for Angus Mackintosh, chief of the Clan Mackintosh, when he married Eva, the only daughter of Dougal Dal, chief of the Clan Chattan, which brought Angus the lands of Glenloy and Loch Arkaig. Angus and Eva lived on the lands of Clan Chattan at Tor Castle but they later withdrew to Rothiemurchus. The castle was then seized by the Clan Cameron, who built a massive tower house and courtyard. Ewen Cameron of Lochiel, 13th chief of Clan Cameron rebuilt the castle in 1530. The Camerons used the castle as a refuge from attacks by the Clan MacDonald of Keppoch.

Structure
The castle consists of a very ruinous tower house.

Referencing

External links
 
Drawing of Tor Castle lochiel.net.
 Tor Castle Virtual Tour

Ruined castles in Highland (council area)
Clan MacDonald of Keppoch
Clan Mackintosh
Clan Cameron
Fort William, Highland
Scheduled Ancient Monuments in Highland